Paid tha Cost to Be da Boss (stylized as Paid tha Cost to Be da Bo$$) is the sixth studio album by American rapper Snoop Dogg. It was released on November 26, 2002, by his Doggystyle label, alongside Priority and Capitol Records. Following his departure from the No Limit Records, he later signed a recording contract to Capitol through Priority Records. The album was supported by two singles, both featuring Pharrell: "From tha Chuuuch to da Palace" and "Beautiful", the latter also featuring Charlie Wilson.

The album debuted at number 12 on the US Billboard 200, selling 174,000 copies in its first week. To date, the album became a certified platinum by the Recording Industry Association of America (RIAA), selling over 1,500,000 copies worldwide.

Music 
This album marked the beginning of Snoop's long-lasting association with Pharrell and The Neptunes. The album's lead single "From tha Chuuuch to da Palace", produced by The Neptunes and featuring an uncredited guest appearance from Pharrell, was released on October 15, 2002. The song's music video was directed by Diane Martel, under the alias Bucky Chrome.

The album's second single, "Beautiful" featuring Pharrell and Charlie Wilson, also produced by The Neptunes, was released on January 28, 2003. The music video for "Beautiful", which featured Pharrell but omitted Charlie Wilson, was directed by Chris Robinson in Brazil, which helped the single to become a hit on the Billboard charts. In a retrospective critique on the song, Pharrell would later admit he didn't think the song would be a hit. "[Snoop] really loved ‘Beautiful.’ I didn’t get ‘Beautiful,’ mainly because I was singing on there flat as fuck and I just didn’t hear it. I thought it was a fun record. And then we put Charlie Wilson on it and I was like man Charlie sounding amazing on this, and this feels good to me, but no one is ever going to go for this."

Release 
It was announced to be re-packaged for the album, with six of these pre-released versions of different album covers, but only several tracks were not to be included on each. Snoop's also contains two-disc's DVD, called Boss Playa: A Day in the Life of Bigg Snoop Dogg; including the first disc featuring three music videos for "Boss Playa", "Pimp Slapp'd" (where both of them, were directed by Pook Brown), and "That's the Shit"; the second disc is a DVD, named "Doggystyle Porn", which features the song, titled "You Like Doin It Too". However, these tracks were later featured in an unreleased project version of the album.

Critical reception 

 Rolling Stone - 3 stars out of 5 - "Snoop stretches his silky flow over tracks by underground ace Hi-Tek and the unstoppable Neptunes."
 Spin - 8 out of 10 - "The most spirited pop record of his career....Paid Tha Cost is Snoop unleashed."
 Entertainment Weekly - "Snoop is reborn, a gangsta rap granddaddy in recline." - Rating: A-
 Uncut - 3 stars out of 5 - "He treads a line between loving monogamy and club bangers, emphasizing accessibility throughout."
 Vibe - 3.5 out of 5 - "His wordplay is still as nimble and quick as ever, giving the beats a beat down with newfound urgency."

Commercial performance 
Paid tha Cost to Be da Boss debuted at number 12 on the US Billboard 200, selling 174,000 copies in its first week. In November 2004, the album sales, where it has sold 1,210,000 copies in the United States.

Controversy 
On March 24, 2003, a lawsuit was filed against Snoop Dogg by a man who claimed that his life was endangered after the rapper had included a 50-second phone message featuring the plaintiff's voice on the album's last track, "Pimp Slapp'd", a diss track directed at then-Death Row Records CEO Suge Knight. The man, identified only as John Doe for security reasons, had left the voice message for Snoop Dogg in October 2002, unaware of the intention of its inclusion on the album. John Doe, who was identified on the answering machine as "Jim Bob", insisted the album be recalled and cancelled for distribution in its current form, and stated in court papers that he had been threatened verbally several times and feared for his and his mother's life due to Knight's close proximity, as both he and Knight resided in Compton, California at the time. 

On February 3, 2004, the lawsuit was dismissed for common law appropriation of voice and intentional infliction of emotional distress, under the ruling that privacy cannot be maintained while leaving a message on another's recording device.

Track listing 

Sample credits
"Da Bo$$ Would Like to See You" samples "It's My House" performed by Diana Ross.
"Stoplight" samples "Flash Light" performed by Parliament.
"From tha Chuuuch to da Palace" samples "Buffalo Gals" performed by Malcolm McLaren.
"Ballin'" samples "Fell for You" performed by The Dramatics.
"Paper'd Up" samples "Paid in Full" performed by Eric B. & Rakim, and "Don't Look Any Further" performed by Dennis Edwards.
"Wasn't Your Fault" samples "I Didn't Mean to Turn You On" performed by Cherrelle.
"Bo$$ Playa" samples "Riding High" performed by Faze-O.
"Hourglass" samples "I Just Want to Be" performed by Cameo.
"The One and Only" samples "It's You, It's You" performed by Tyrone Davis.
"I Miss That Bitch" samples "I'm Your Mechanical Man" performed by Jerry Butler.
"From Long Beach 2 Brick City" samples "Wikka Wrap" performed by The Evasions.
"Batman & Robin" samples "Batman" performed by TeeVee Toons, Inc.
"Pimp Slapp'd" samples "Rapper's Delight" performed by Sugarhill Gang, "Tonite" performed by DJ Quik, "Flash Light" performed by Parliament, and "Streets is Watching" performed by Jay-Z.

Personnel 
Credits adapted from Allmusic.

 Dave Aron - engineer, mixing
 B-Real - congas
 Battlecat - producer
 Daniel Betancourt - assistant
 Joe Ceballos - coloring
 Keith Clark - producer
 Andrew Coleman - engineer
 Snoopy Collins - background vocals
 DJ Hi-Tek - producer
 DJ Premier - producer
 Nate Dogg - vocals
 The Dramatics - vocals
 E-Swift - producer
 Shy Felder - background vocals, vocals
 Warren G - vocals
 Brian Gardner - mastering
 Goldie Loc - vocals
 Mamie Gunn - background vocals
 Robin Hill - sample clearance
 Brian Horton - flute
 Chad Hugo - instrumentation
 Richard Huredia - mixing
 L.T. Hutton - producer
 Jay-Z - vocals
 Jelly Roll - background vocals, mixing, producer
 Eric Johnson - bass
 Just Blaze - producer
 Ronnie King - hammond organ

 Lady of Rage - vocals
 Josef Leimberg - producer
 Ken Lewis - mixing
 Lil' ½ Dead - vocals
 Quazedelic - background vocals,
Vocals, 
 Ludacris - vocals
 Anthony Mandler - photography
 Kokane - vocals
 Fredwreck - fender rhodes, flute, mixing, moog synthesizer, producer, sequencing
 Traci Nelson - background vocals, vocals
 The Neptunes - producer
 James Rainey - sample clearance
 RBX - vocals
 Redman - vocals
 Eric Roinestad - art direction
 Eddie Sancho - mixing
 Chris Sholar - guitar
 Snoop Dogg - primary artist, sequencing
 Soopafly - vocals
 Nancie Stern - sample clearance
 Dexter Thibou - assistant engineer
 Patrick Viala - mixing
 Meech Wells - producer
 LaToiya Williams - vocals
 Marlon Williams - guitar
 Pharrell Williams - instrumentation, vocals
 Charlie Wilson - vocals
 Christian Olde Wolbers - bass

Engineer- Reddbrothers (Dwayne & Daniel)

Charts

Weekly charts

Year-end charts

Certifications

References

External links 
 Top40-charts
 Official Myspace
 

Snoop Dogg albums
2002 albums
Albums produced by Battlecat (producer)
Albums produced by Daz Dillinger
Albums produced by DJ Premier
Albums produced by Fredwreck
Albums produced by Hi-Tek
Albums produced by JellyRoll
Albums produced by L.T. Hutton
Albums produced by Just Blaze
Albums produced by the Neptunes
Capitol Records albums
Doggystyle Records albums
Priority Records albums